A Doll Wife is a 1919 silent Italian drama film directed by Carmine Gallone. The film was shown as part of the Silent Divas of the Italian Cinema programme at the 38th New York Film Festival in 2000.

Cast
 Soava Gallone as Susanne di Montalto, detta Maman Poupée
 Bruno Emanuel Palmi as Il marito
 Mina D'Orvella as La rivale
 Mario Cusmich

References

External links
 

1919 films
1919 drama films
Italian silent feature films
Italian black-and-white films
Films directed by Carmine Gallone
Italian drama films
Silent drama films